The 2020 East–West Shrine Bowl was the 95th staging of the all–star college football exhibition to benefit Shriners Hospital for Children. The game was played at Tropicana Field in St. Petersburg, Florida, on January 18, 2020, with a 3:00 PM EST kickoff, televised on the NFL Network. It was one of the final 2019–20 bowl games concluding the 2019 FBS football season. The game featured NCAA players (predominantly from the Football Bowl Subdivision) and a few select invitees from Canadian university football, rostered into "East" and "West" teams. This was the first playing to be called the East–West Shrine Bowl, as prior editions had been the East–West Shrine Game.

The game featured more than 100 players from the 2019 NCAA Division I FBS football season and prospects for the 2020 draft of the professional National Football League (NFL). In the week prior to the game, NFL scouts and agents attended team practices. Coaches and game officials were supplied by the NFL.

The day before the game, the event's Pat Tillman Award was presented to James Morgan, quarterback of the FIU Panthers—the award is "presented to a player who best exemplifies character, intelligence, sportsmanship and service. The award is about a student-athlete's achievements and conduct, both on and off the field."

Coaching staffs
Head coaches were announced on January 8, 2020, as Mike Caldwell of the Tampa Bay Buccaneers and Ben Steele of the Atlanta Falcons, responsible for the East and West squads, respectively.

Players
Players who accept invitations to the game are listed on the official website. Notable and selected players are listed in this section.

East team

Source:

West team

Source:

Game summary

Statistics

See also
2020 NFL Draft

References

Further reading

External links
 2020 East–West Shrine Bowl highlights via YouTube

East West Shrine Bowl
East–West Shrine Bowl
American football in Florida
Sports competitions in St. Petersburg, Florida
East West Shrine Bowl
East-West Shrine Bowl